The Roman Catholic Archdiocese of Samarinda is an archdiocese located in the city of Samarinda in Indonesia.

In addition to the cathedral, St. Mary's in Samarinda, there are two other parishes serving the faithful: St. Luke's in Temindung (Paroki Santo Lukas Temindung) and the Church of the Sacred Heart of Jesus in Seberang (Paroki Hati Kudus Yesus).

History
 February 21, 1955: Established as Apostolic Vicariate of Samarinda from the Apostolic Vicariate of Bandjarmasin
 January 3, 1961: Promoted as Diocese of Samarinda
 January 29, 2003: Promoted as Metropolitan Archdiocese of Samarinda

Leadership
 Archbishops of Samarinda (Roman rite)
 Archbishop Yustinus Harjosusanto, M.S.F. (February 15, 2015 – )
 Archbishop Florentinus Sului Hajang Hau, M.S.F. (January 29, 2003 – July 18, 2013)
 Bishops of Samarinda (Roman Rite) 
Bishop Florentinus Sului Hajang Hau, M.S.F. (later Archbishop) (April 5, 1993 – January 29, 2003)
 Bishop Michael Cornelis C. Coomans, M.S.F. (November 30, 1987 – May 6, 1992)
 Bishop Jacques Henri Romeijn, M.S.F. (January 3, 1961 – February 11, 1975)
 Vicars Apostolic of Samarinda (Roman Rite) 
 Bishop Jacques Henri Romeijn, M.S.F. (July 10, 1955 – January 3, 1961)

Suffragan dioceses
 Banjarmasin
 Palangkaraya
 Tanjung Selor

Sources
 GCatholic.org
 Catholic Hierarchy

Samarinda
Christian organizations established in 1955
Samarinda
Samarinda
1955 establishments in Indonesia